The Logan, also known as El Beudor or the Sherwyn Hotel, is a historic building in Omaha, Nebraska. It was built in 1918, and designed by architect James T. Allan. It has been listed on the National Register of Historic Places since July 22, 2005.

References

National Register of Historic Places in Omaha, Nebraska
Early Commercial architecture in the United States
Commercial buildings completed in 1918
1918 establishments in Nebraska